The playoff round of the 2015 IIHF World Championship was held from 14 to 17 May 2015. The top four of each preliminary group qualified for the playoff round.

Qualified teams

Bracket

Quarterfinals

United States vs Switzerland
The game started out with an early and surprising first period lead for Switzerland after a goal from NHLer Roman Josi. The United States scored 2 quick goals midway through of the game, switching the lead to the Americans, but the Swiss' weren't done until Jake Gardiner scored the third goal ten minutes before the end of the game which put the United States in the semifinals.

Canada vs Belarus
The game was nearly wrapped up after the first period, in which Canada scored four goals, including one after just 27 seconds by Brent Burns. The Canadians were in full control and never let up and ended up winning convincingly 9–0 while putting up 50 shots.

Sweden vs Russia
After around 20 minutes the game looked already decided in favour of Russia, but the Swedish team fought back and tied it up with five minutes to go. Only 26 seconds after the equalizer Evgeni Malkin scored the go-ahead goal for the Russians who advanced after scoring an empty netter late in the game.

Finland vs Czech Republic
The last quarterfinal of the day was the closest one as Finland and the Czech Republic matched up.
The teams went toe to toe until it was 3–3 with 15 minutes to go. Jan Kovář and Jaromír Jágr became the heroes as both recorded three points to help the Czechs win the game 5–3.

Semifinals

Canada vs Czech Republic
Canada continued their unbeaten run against the hosts, who added Tomáš Plekanec shortly before the game, in front of 17,383 people. A goal from Taylor Hall after nearly nine minutes put Canada up 1–0 before Jason Spezza made it a two-goal lead midway through the game. The Czechs weren't able to squeeze a puck behind Mike Smith, who recorded his second straight shutout.

United States vs Russia
Russia got a boost before the game by adding Alexander Ovechkin to their roster. The game was scoreless through two periods before Sergei Mozyakin opened the scoring after 47 minutes. Ovechkin recorded his first two points shortly after to help Russia beat the United States 4–0 after a third period burst.

Bronze medal game
The US-team was able to grab the bronze medal despite being outshot 16 to 39 but were able to get a shutout. Two first period goals and the second goal by Charlie Coyle wrapped the 3–0 victory up.

Gold medal game

References

External links
Official website

P